Platanthera dilatata, known as tall white bog orchid, bog candle, or boreal bog orchid is a species of orchid, a flowering plant in the family Orchidaceae, native to North America. It was first formally described in 1813 by Frederick Traugott Pursh as Orchis dilatata.

It is sometimes called fragrant white bog orchid or scentbottle, for the smell of its flowers, described as intensely spicy or clove-like.

In the Midwest and northeastern United States and Canada, it grows in cold, calcareous fens, cedar and tamarack swamps, meadows, and marshes, typically in sunny spots.

Description
The showy, white flowers are clustered on long spikes. The petals are ovate to linear-lance shaped with smooth edges, not divided or fringed like some other Platanthera species. The lateral sepals spread or reflex.

The leaves are linear to lanceolate or oblanceolate, and reduce in size toward the top of the plant.

Three varieties are accepted:
Platanthera dilatata var. albiflora – Colorado to Alaska
Platanthera dilatata var. dilatata – Colorado to Alaska, Great Lakes and northeastern US and Canada, absent in most of the Great Plains
Platanthera dilatata var. leucostachys — western US and Canada, from southern California to Alaska

Uses 
British Columbian Native Americans used the sweet-smelling flowers in washing themselves.

References

dilatata
Flora of North America